A ministry of electricity is a government department responsible for electricity, including:

 Ministry of Electricity and Renewable Energy (Egypt)
 Ministry of Electricity (Iraq)
 Ministry of Electricity and Energy (Myanmar)
 Ministry of Electricity and Dams (South Sudan)
 Ministry of Electricity (Syria)

Lists of government ministries